Caladenia lowanensis, commonly known as Wimmera spider orchid, is a plant in the orchid family Orchidaceae and is endemic to Victoria, Australia. It is a ground orchid with a single leaf and a single cream-coloured flower with red lines and blotches. The total population of this orchid was estimated in 2010 to be only about 700 plants but most are protected in reserves.

Description
Caladenia lowanensis is a terrestrial, perennial, deciduous, herb with a spherical underground tuber. The flowers are cream-coloured with red streaks and blotches. Flowering occurs in September and October.

Taxonomy and naming
Caladenia lowanensis  was first formally described in 1991 by Geoffrey Carr from a specimen collected near Kiata and the description was published in Indigenous Flora and Fauna Association Miscellaneous Paper 1. The specific epithet (lowanensis) is derived from the Lowan district of Victoria with the Latin suffix -ensis meaning "of" or "from" referring to the distribution of this orchid species.

Distribution and habitat
The Wimmera spider orchid grows in sparse woodland near Kiata, in and near the Little Desert National Park.

Conservation
Caladenia lowanensis  is listed as  "endangered" under the Victorian Flora and Fauna Guarantee Act 1988 and under the Australian Government Environment Protection and Biodiversity Conservation Act 1999. In 2010 the known population of this species was 700 plants in five populations but about 90% of these were protected in reserves. The main threats to the species are rubbish dumping, trampling, weed invasion and grazing by rabbits (Oryctolagus cuniculus).

References

lowanensis
Plants described in 1991
Endemic orchids of Australia
Orchids of Victoria (Australia)